Lawn Mower Man is the second solo studio album by Canadian rapper Madchild. It was released on August 6, 2013 via Battle Axe/Suburban Noize Records. Production was handled by C-Lance, Rob the Viking, Chin Injeti and The iKonz, with Kevin Zinger and Madchild serving as executive producers. It features guest appearances from Sophia Danai, Bishop Lamont, JD Era, Prevail and Slaine. The album peaked at number two on the Canadian Albums Chart and at number 150 on the US Billboard 200.

Track listing

Personnel
Shane "Madchild" Bunting – main artist, executive producer
Sophia Danai – featured artist (tracks: 3, 6)
George "Slaine" Carroll – featured artist (track 4)
Kiley "Prevail" Hendriks – featured artist (track 11)
Joseph "JD Era" Dako – featured artist (track 12)
Philip "Bishop Lamont" Martin – featured artist (track 12)
Robin "Rob the Viking" Hooper – producer (tracks: 4, 5, 7-9, 11), arranger, cover photo
Craig "C-Lance" Lanciani – producer (tracks: 1, 2, 8, 10, 13, 14)
Pranam "Chin" Injeti – producer (tracks: 3, 6)
The Ikonz – producers (track 12)
Kevin Zinger – executive producer, management
Alex Rauch – design, layout
Ivory Daniel – management
Chris Herche – management

Charts

References

External links

2013 albums
Madchild albums